Wayãpi or Wayampi (Waiãpi, Guayapi, Oiampí) is a Tupi–Guarani language spoken by the Wayãpi people. It is spoken in French Guiana and Brazil.

Phonology

Consonants

Vowels 

In closed syllables, /e, o/ are heard as [, ].

Orthography
Wayãpi is spelt phonetically based on the International Phonetic Alphabet, and not according the French orthography. The spelling uses the letter ɨ for the close central unrounded vowel between i and u. E is always pronounced é, vowels with a tilde are always nasal (ã, ẽ, ĩ, õ, ũ), ö is like the German O umlaut, and b is pronounced mb. All letters are pronounced.

References

Bibliography

External links
Wayampi (Intercontinental Dictionary Series)

Tupi–Guarani languages
Languages of French Guiana
Languages of Brazil